Shantadurga (Devanagari:शांतादुर्गा) is the most popular form of the Hindu goddess Durga revered in Goa, India, as well some parts of Karnataka. She is a form of the ancient Mother goddess known as Santeri. She is worshipped in almost all villages of Goa as an ant hill. This is seen in some temples dedicated to Shantadurga.

Origins
Only the title of the chapter mentions the goddess Shantadurga and no where else is this epithet of the goddess mentioned. This section refers to a certain sage , a resident of Nagavya (modern Nagoa). The goddess appeared before Shantamuni and hence she's known as Shantadurga. Durga is portrayed in her ferocious nature in many of the places,yet the adjective Shanta (peaceful) is found in almost all Namavalis of Durga.In verses 16,19,34 of Sahyadrikhanda, the goddess is called  (Shanta-devi). The verse 18 of this section mentions about the disappearance of the goddess into an ant hill. These ant hills symbolically represent goddess Shantadurga as well as goddess Santeri.

According to another lore,once there was a terrible war between the gods Shiva and Vishnu due to which the entire world was distressed. Hence the god Brahma prayed and implored Shakti (the Divine Mother) to intervene and stop the war. The Goddess held Shiva by one hand and Vishnu by the other hand and brought about reconciliation among them. This stopped the war and brought peace to the world. Such an idol of goddess is found in the inner sanctum of Shanta Durga Temple of Kavale. The 17th-century Marathi  furnishes an exhaustive account of the conflict between the followers of the Vaisnavism (sect of Vishnu worshippers) and Shaivism (Shiva followers) in Goa. It is quite possible that,this lore of Shantadurga is symbolically represents these sectarian conflicts.

Iconography
Though in few shrines dedicated to Shantadurga, an ant hill is found inside the sanctum in place a stone, metal image of the deity or a Kalasha is consecrated. Especially in Kavale temple metal image of the deity which is four handed, is depicted holding two male figures (Vishnu and Shiva) in her lower hands and snakes in the upper hands. Most of the Shantadurga temples have stone sculpture of Mahishasuramardini aspect of Shakti. Whereas some have stone or metal idol with four hands, sometimes seen holding any of the following: sword, bowl of ambrosia, a shield, trident(), hand kettle drum, lotus, and snakes. In rare cases a Kalasha is worshiped as a symbol of the deity (especially in Shantadurga Kumbharjuvekarin temple at Marcela, Goa). Few temples also worship ant hill alongside an image.

Temples in Goa
Shri Shantadurga Temple at Kandoli(Candolim) Goa.
Shri Shantadurga Temple at Kavale
Shantadurga Kunkalikarin at Fatorpa
Shantadurga Fatarpekarin at Fatorpa
Shri Shantadurga Khandparkarin at Khandepar
Shantadurga Chamundeshwari Kudtari Mahamaya at Avedem, Quepem
Shantadurna Kunkaliekarin at Kunkolie Ponda
Shatadurga Kumbharjuvekarin at Marcela, Ponda
Shantadurga Verlekarin at Marcela Ponda
Shantadurga Talaulikarin at Marcela
Shantadurga Mhapsekarin at Dhargal
Shantadurga Sangodkarin at Sangolda
Shantadurga at Veroda
Shantadurga Shankhavaleshvari at Veling, Gothan

Shantadurga Ballikarin at Balli
Shantadurga Kalangutkarin Temple, Nanora, near Asnora
Shantadurga Pilarnkarin Devasthan Narve Bicholim
Shri Shantadurga Temp
le at Gaonkar Wada, Bicholim
Shree Sateri Shantadurga Devasthan, Khandola Goa
Shri Shantadurga Devasthan Vaghurme,Vaghurme-Vere,Ponda-Goa
Shantadurga Temple at Mhapan, Vengurla<ref

References

Hinduism in Goa
Hindu goddesses
Konkan